The posterior longitudinal ligament is a ligament connecting the posterior surfaces of the vertebral bodies of all of the vertebrae. It weakly prevents hyperflexion of the vertebral column. It also prevents posterior spinal disc herniation, although problems with the ligament can cause it.

Structure 
The posterior longitudinal ligament is situated within the vertebral canal. It extends along the posterior surfaces of the bodies of the vertebrae, from the body of the axis to the sacrum and possibly the coccyx. It is continuous with the tectorial membrane of atlanto-axial joint. The ligament is thicker in the thoracic than in the cervical and lumbar regions. In the thoracic and lumbar regions, it presents a series of dentations with intervening concave margins.

The posterior longitudinal ligament is narrow at the vertebral bodies, where it covers the basivertebral veins, and widens at the intervertebral disc space. It is generally quite wide and thin.

This ligament is composed of smooth, shining, longitudinal fibers, denser and more compact than those of the anterior ligament, and consists of superficial layers occupying the interval between three or four vertebræ, and deeper layers which extend between adjacent vertebrae. Deep fibres run between each vertebral body. Superficial fibres run between multiple vertebrae.

Function 
The posterior longitudinal ligament weakly prevents hyperflexion of the vertebral column. It also limits spinal disc herniation, although it is much narrower than the anterior longitudinal ligament.

Clinical significance 
The posterior longitudinal ligament is much narrower than the anterior longitudinal ligament. Because of this, spinal disc herniations usually occur in a posterolateral direction.

The posterior longitudinal ligament contains a higher density of nociceptors than many ligaments, so can cause back pain. It may ossify, particularly around cervical vertebrae.

The posterior longitudinal ligament has a high density of vasomotor fibres, allowing for increased blood flow to respond to damage to the ligament.

See also
Anterior longitudinal ligament
Intervertebral disc

References

Additional images

External links
  - "Vertebral Column, Dissection, Anterior & Posterior Views"
  - "Lateral Pharyngeal Region"

Ligaments of the torso
Bones of the vertebral column
Ligaments of the head and neck